The surname Bowers is of Saxon origin, derived from the word 'bur' meaning 'a chamber; a cottage; a shady recess'. Adding 'er' to the end of topographical terms was common in south east England. An alternative origin is "a maker of bows".

Persons

 Barney Bowers (born 1959), British football player
 Bryan Bowers (born 1940), American autoharp player
 Cedrick Bowers (born 1978), American baseball player
 Charles Bowers (1889–1946), American cartoonist and comedian
 Charles P. Bowers (1929–2015), American baseball player, coach and talent scout
 Chris Bowers (born 1974), American political blogger
 Claude Bowers (1878–1958), American politician
 DaQuan Bowers (born 1990), American football player
 Dane Bowers (born 1979), British pop singer, songwriter and producer
 David Bowers (director), English animator and film director
 David A. Bowers (born 1952), the mayor of Roanoke, Virginia
 David Frederick Bowers (1906–1945), American philosopher
 Drew Bowers (1886–1985), American politician
 Eaton J. Bowers (1865–1939), American politician
 Edgar Bowers (1924–2000), American poet
 Edward Charles Bowers (1845–1929), Canadian politician
 Eilley Bowers (1826–1903), American miner, socialite and fortune-teller
 Elaine Bowers (born 1963), American politician
 Elizabeth Crocker Bowers (1830–1895), American actress
 Faubion Bowers (1917–1999), American author and orientalist 
 Fredson Bowers (1905–1991), American bibliographer and scholar
 Geoffrey Bowers (1954–1987), American lawyer, plaintiff in early AIDS discrimination case
 George Bowers (filmmaker) (born 1944), American film director and editor
 George Hull Bowers (1794–1872), British cleric
 George M. Bowers (1863–1925), American politician
 Georgina Bowers (1836–1912), British artist 
 Henry Francis Bowers (1837–1911), American anti-Catholic activist
 Henry Robertson Bowers (1883–1912), British seaman and Antarctic explorer
 Jack Bowers (1908–1970), British football player
 Jack E. Bowers (1925–2007), American politician and lawyer
 Jane Bowers (1921–2000), American folk singer and songwriter
 John Bowers (actor) (1885–1936), American stage and silent film actor
 John Bowers (bishop) (1854–1926), British Anglican bishop
 John Bowers (diplomat) (1912–2004), British diplomat
 John Bowers (loudspeaker builder) (1923–1987), British telecommunications engineer
 John Bowers (writer) (born 1928), American writer
 John C. Bowers (1811–1873), African American entrepreneur, organist, abolitionist
 John M. Bowers (1772–1846), American politician
 Joseph Bowers (1896–1936), American escapee from Alcatraz prison
 Joseph Oliver Bowers (1910–2012), Dominican Catholic bishop
 Kathryn I. Bowers (1943–2015), American politician
 Kent Bowers (died 1985), Belizean murderer
 Lally Bowers (1917–1984), British actress
 Lee Bowers (1925–1966), witness to the assassination of John F. Kennedy
 Lloyd Wheaton Bowers (1859–1910), American Solicitor General
 M. F. Bowers, sheriff of El Paso County, Colorado, 1894–1896
 Marci Bowers (born 1958), American gynecologist
 Mike Bowers (born 1942), American lawyer, Attorney General of Georgia
 Nick Bowers (born 1996), American football player
 Peter M. Bowers (1918–2003), American aviation journalist
 Q. David Bowers (born 1938), American numismatist
 Thomas Bowers (singer) (c. 1826 – 1885), American concert singer
 William W. Bowers (1834–1917), American politician
 R. J. Bowers  (born 1974), professional American football player
 Robert Bowers (disambiguation), several people
 Roni Bowers (died 2001), American Christian missionary
 Ross Bowers (disambiguation)
 Sam Bowers (gridiron football) (born  1957), American football player
 Samuel Bowers (1924–2006), American leader of the Ku Klux Klan
 Sean Bowers (born 1968), American soccer player
 Shane Bowers (disambiguation), several people
  Stephen Bowers, South Australian ceramicist and co-creator of the Yerrakartarta in Adelaide
 Stephen C. Bowers, California politician during the American Civil War
 Stew Bowers (1915–2005), American baseball player
 Timmy Bowers (born 1982), American basketball player
 Tony Bowers (born 1952), British pop musician
 William Bowers (1916–1987), American screenwriter
 Alex Bowers (born 1994), American physician

Fictional
 Henry Bowers, an antagonist of Stephen King's IT

See also
Bauers, a similar surname
Bower (surname)

References

English-language surnames
Surnames of English origin
Surnames of British Isles origin
Toponymic surnames